Nathan D. Wendell (1835, Fort Plain, Montgomery County, New York – January 5, 1886, Albany, Albany County, New York) was an American banker and politician.

Life
He first learned the printer's trade, but in 1854 went to Albany and began to work for the Merchants' National Bank with which he remained until the day of his death, having become Cashier in 1864 and Vice President in 1880.

In 1872, he was elected Treasurer of Albany County. In 1876, he was a presidential elector. He was New York State Treasurer from 1880 to 1881, elected in 1879. He was an alternate delegate to the 1884 Republican National Convention.

At a time, he was one of the co-owners of the Albany Morning Express newspaper.

He was the receiver of the Universal Life Insurance Company of New York City.

Sources
 Obit in NYT on January 6, 1886
 The Universal life receivership, in NYT on April 22, 1882
 Political Graveyard
 Republican nominations, in NYT on September 4, 1879

1835 births
1886 deaths
New York State Treasurers
People from Fort Plain, New York
Politicians from Albany, New York
American bankers
1876 United States presidential electors
19th-century American newspaper people
19th-century American journalists
American male journalists
19th-century American male writers
19th-century American politicians
Journalists from New York (state)
Businesspeople from Albany, New York
19th-century American businesspeople